is a 1957 Japanese jidaigeki film co-written, produced, edited, and directed by Akira Kurosawa, with special effects by Eiji Tsuburaya. The film transposes the plot of William Shakespeare's play Macbeth from Medieval Scotland to feudal Japan, with stylistic elements drawn from Noh drama. The film stars Toshiro Mifune and Isuzu Yamada in the lead roles, modelled on the characters Macbeth and Lady Macbeth.

As with the play, the film tells the story of a warrior who assassinates his sovereign at the urging of his ambitious wife. Kurosawa was a fan of the play and intended to make his own adaptation for several years, delaying it after learning of Orson Welles' Macbeth (1948). Among his changes was the ending, which required archers to fire arrows around Mifune. The film was shot around Mount Fuji and Izu Peninsula.

Despite the change in setting and language and numerous creative liberties, Throne of Blood is often considered one of the best film adaptations of the play, and has received much critical praise. The film won two Mainichi Film Awards, including Best Actor for Toshiro Mifune.

Plot
Generals Miki and Washizu are samurai commanders and friends under Tsuzuki, a local lord who reigns in the castle of the Spider's Web Forest. After defeating the lord's enemies in battle, they return to his castle. On their way through the thick forest, they meet an evil spirit, who foretells their future, telling them that Washizu will be named Lord of the Northern Garrison and Miki will become commander of the first fortress that day. The spirit then foretells that Washizu eventually will become Lord of Spider's Web Castle, and finally Miki's son will become lord. When the two return to Tsuzuki's estate, he rewards them with exactly what the spirit had predicted. As Washizu discusses this with his wife Asaji, she manipulates him into causing the second part of the prophecy to come true by murdering Tsuzuki when he visits.

Asaji gives drugged sake to Tsuzuki's guards, causing them to fall asleep and allowing Washizu to enter Tsuzuki's bedchamber and kill him in his sleep. When Washizu returns in shock at his deed, Asaji grabs the bloody spear and puts it in the hands of one of an unconscious guard, then cries out that an intruder has entered the castle; Washizu slays the guard before he has a chance to plead his innocence. Kunimaru, Tsuzuki's vengeful son, and Noriyasu, one of Tsuzuki's advisors,  both suspect Washizu's treachery and try to warn Miki, who refuses to believe what they are saying about his friend. Under Asaji's influence, Washizu is unsure of Miki's loyalty, but chooses Miki's son as his heir because he and Asaji have no child of their own. Washizu plans to tell Miki and his son about his decision at a grand banquet. However, Asaji tells him that she is pregnant, which leaves him with a quandary concerning his heir; now Miki and his son have to be eliminated.

During the banquet, Washizu is agitated because Miki and his son have not shown up, and drinks sake copiously. He loses his self-control when Miki's ghost suddenly appears. In a delusional panic, he reveals what has happened to Miki by exclaiming that he is willing to slay Miki a second time, unsheathing his sword and slashing at the empty air near Miki's seat. Attempting to cover for him, Asaji tells the guests that he is drunk and has everyone retire for the evening. One of Washizu's men arrives carrying a bundle containing the severed head of Miki, and tells Washizu and Asaji that Miki's son escaped. Washizu kills the assassin.

Later, Washizu's men are beginning to doubt and fear him, and rumors circulate that Miki's son Yoshiteru, Kunimaru, and Noriyasu have joined forces with their onetime rival Inui. Washizu is distraught by the news that his heir has been born dead. In order to ascertain the outcome of the impending battle with his foes, he returns to the forest in search of the evil spirit. The spirit tells him that he will not be defeated in battle until "the trees of the Spider's Web Forest rise against the castle". Washizu believes this is impossible and becomes confident of his victory. Washizu tells his troops of the prophecy, and they share his confidence. The next morning, Washizu is awakened by the screams of Asaji's attendants. In her quarters, he finds Asaji in a semi-catatonic state, trying to wash clean an imaginary stain and stench of blood from her hands. Distracted by the sound of his troops, Washizu leaves to investigate. Washizu is told by a panicked soldier that the trees of Spider's Web Forest "have risen to attack us".

Washizu tries to muster his troops, but they ignore his commands and begin firing arrows at him. several go through his armor and one pierces his neck, severely wounding him, and when he tells them that to kill their lord is treason, they accuse Washizu of the murder of his predecessor. With his enemies approaching the castle gates, he falls to his arrow wounds, trying to draw his sword as he dies. It is then revealed that the attacking force had used trees, cut from the forest during the night, to shield their advance onto the castle.

Cast

Crew

 Akira Kurosawa – director, co-writer, producer, editor
 Eiji Tsuburaya – special effects director
 Yoshimitsu Banno – assistant director
 Kuichirō Kishida – lighting
 Takao Saitō – camera assistant
 Masao Fukuda – still photographer
 Kohei Ezaki – chief art director
 Yoshirō Muraki – art director and costume designer
 Masanori Kobayashi – make-up artist
 Ichirō Minawa – sound effects

Personnel taken from Throne of Blood by Robert N. Watson.

Production

Development

William Shakespeare's plays had been read in Japan since the Meiji Restoration in 1868, though banned during World War II for not being Japanese. Director Akira Kurosawa stated that he had admired Shakespeare's Macbeth for a long time, and that he envisioned making a film adaptation of it after he completed his 1950 film Rashomon. When he learned that Orson Welles had released his own version of Macbeth in 1948, Kurosawa decided to postpone his adaptation project for several years.

Kurosawa believed that Scotland and Japan in the Middle Ages shared social problems and that these had lessons for the present day. Moreover, Macbeth could serve as a cautionary tale complementing his 1952 film Ikiru.

In May 1956, Kurosawa announced that he would be producing three samurai films for Toho, Throne of Blood, The Hidden Fortress, and Revenge, each to be filmed from September 1956 to early 1957 by other directors. Ishirō Honda, best known for directing the 1954 kaiju film Godzilla, was slated to direct Throne of Blood, but Kurosawa ended up direct all three films himself.

The film combines Shakespeare's play with the Noh style of drama. Kurosawa was an admirer of Noh, which he preferred over Kabuki. In particular, he wished to incorporate Noh-style body movements and set design. Noh also makes use of masks, and the evil spirit is seen, in different parts of the film, wearing faces reminiscent of these masks, starting with yaseonna (old lady). Noh often stresses the Buddhist doctrine of impermanence. This is connected to Washizu being denied salvation, with the chorus singing that his ghost is still in the world. Furthermore, the film score's use of flute and drum are drawn from Noh.

Writing
All three of Kurosawa's frequent script collaborators participated for the first time: Hideo Oguni, Shinobu Hashimoto, and Ryūzō Kikushima, each working with the director for their fourth time. Initially, the screenwriters wrote the script with the intention that it would be directed by Ishirō Honda, but Toho insisted Kurosawa take the directing position after reading the script and realizing a large budget was required for the film.

Set design

The castle exteriors were built and shot on the volcanic slopes of Mount Fuji. The castle courtyard was constructed at Toho's Tamagawa studio, with volcanic soil brought from Fuji so that the ground matched. The interiors were shot in a smaller studio in Tokyo. The forest scenes were a combination of actual Fuji forest and studio shots in Tokyo. Washizu's mansion was shot in the Izu Peninsula.

In Kurosawa's own words, 

Production designer Yoshirō Muraki said the crew opted to employ the color black in the set walls, and a lot of armor, to complement the mist and fog effects. This design was based on ancient scrolls depicting Japanese castles.

Special effects
The scene in which trees from the Spider's Web Forest approach the castle, was created by Toho's special effects department and directed by Eiji Tsuburaya. Originally, this scene was longer, but Kurosawa cut several shots of trees from the film because he was unimpressed by them.

Washizu's death scene, in which his own archers turn upon him and shoot him with arrows, was in fact performed with real arrows, shot by knowledgeable and skilled archers. During filming, Mifune waved his arms, which was how the actor indicated his intended bodily direction. This was for his own safety in order to prevent the archers from accidentally hitting him.

Release
The film was released theatrically in Japan on January 15, 1957 by Toho, and grossed , making it the second-highest-grossing Japanese film of 1957, after Shintoho's Emperor Meiji and the Great Russo-Japanese War, which grossed ¥542.91 million. In the United States, the film was distributed by Brandon Films with English subtitles at 105 minutes and opened on November 22, 1961.

Throne of Blood was the first film to be screened at the 1st BFI London Film Festival on October 16, 1957. After the screening, Akira Kurosawa attended a party at film critic Dilys Powell's house, and had dinner with actor Laurence Olivier, and actress Vivien Leigh who were planning on playing Macbeth and Lady Macbeth in a film adaptation of William Shakespeare's Macbeth that never materialized. Oliver told Kurosawa that he had enjoyed watching the film and was impressed by the scene in which Toshiro Mifune's Macbeth is shot by arrows. Isuzu Yamada's acting impressed Leigh, and she asked why Yamada made such little movement when she was mad.

In 1991, the film was released in the United States on LaserDisc by The Criterion Collection, and on VHS by Media Home Entertainment. Toho released the film on DVD in Japan in 2002 and on Blu-ray in 2010. In 2013, Madman Entertainment distributed the film on DVD in Region 4. In Region A, The Criterion Collection released the film on Blu-ray in 2014, having released the film on DVD 10 years earlier.

In 2018, the film was screened by the National Film Archive of Japan at the Essential 2018 National Film Archive Opening Cinema Memorial in Kyōbashi, Tokyo, along with 9 other Japanese films. In 2021, the Kawakita Memorial Film Institute screened a 4K remaster of the film at the 12th 10am Film Festival.

Reception

Critical response
On review aggregator Rotten Tomatoes the film has an approval rating of 95% based on 44 reviews, with an average score of 8.80/10. The site's consensus states, "A career high point for Akira Kurosawa – and one of the best film adaptations of a Shakespeare play".

In 1961, the Time review praised Kurosawa and the film as "a visual descent into the hell of greed and superstition". Bosley Crowther from The New York Times called the idea of Shakespeare in Japanese "amusing", and complimented the cinematography. Most critics stated it was the visuals that filled the gap left by the removal of Shakespeare's poetry. U.K. directors Geoffrey Reeve and Peter Brook considered the film to be a masterpiece, but denied it was a Shakespeare film because of the language. Film historian Donald Richie praised the film as "a marvel because it is made of so little: fog, wind, trees, mist". Film critic Stephen Prince compared its minimalist landscapes to the painting technique sumi-e.

The film has received praise from literary critics despite the many liberties it takes with the original play. The American literary critic Harold Bloom judged it "the most successful film version of Macbeth". Sylvan Barnet writes it captured Macbeth as a strong warrior, and that "Without worrying about fidelity to the original," Throne of Blood is "much more satisfactory" than most Shakespeare films. Film historian David A. Conrad wrote that just as Shakespeare's play commented on "questions of legitimacy, masculinity, and civil war" that resonated in early 17th-century England, Kurosawa's movie engages with contemporary Japanese debates about the "spiderless cobweb" of postwar bureaucracy and industry. In his Movie Guide, Leonard Maltin gave the film four stars, calling it a "graphic, powerful adaptation".

Accolades

Legacy
Akira Kurosawa's 1960 film The Bad Sleep Well, was heavily influenced by William Shakespeare's Hamlet, as well as The Count of Monte Cristo by Alexandre Dumas. Roman Polanski's 1971 film version of Macbeth has similarities to Throne of Blood, in shots of characters on twisted roads, set design, and music to identify locations and psychological conditions. Toshiro Mifune's death scene was the source of inspiration for Piper Laurie's death scene in the 1976 film Carrie, in which knives are thrown at her, in this case by character Carrie White using her psychic powers. In 1985, Kurosawa returned to adapting Shakespeare, choosing the play King Lear for his final epic film Ran, and again moving the setting to feudal Japan.

Throne of Blood is referenced in the anime film Millennium Actress (2001) in the form of the Forest Spirit/Witch. It was adapted for the stage by director Ping Chong, premiering at the 2010 Oregon Shakespeare Festival in Ashland, Oregon.

See also

 The Bad Sleep Well
 List of Japanese films of 1957
 List of William Shakespeare screen adaptations
 Ran

References

Bibliography

External links 

 
 
 Throne of Blood at the official Japanese-language Toho website (archived)
 The Throne of Blood at the official English-language Toho website (archived)
 Throne of Blood at the Criterion Collection
Throne of Blood: Shakespeare Transposed an essay by Stephen Prince at the Criterion Collection
 Program notes from the 1957 San Francisco International Film Festival
 Throne of Blood at the Japanese Movie Database 

1957 films
Jidaigeki films
Japanese historical drama films
Films based on Macbeth
Films directed by Akira Kurosawa
Films produced by Sōjirō Motoki
Japanese black-and-white films
Japanese films based on plays
1950s Japanese-language films
Samurai films
Films with screenplays by Akira Kurosawa
Films with screenplays by Hideo Oguni
Films scored by Masaru Sato
Films shot in Tokyo
Films set in castles
Films with screenplays by Ryuzo Kikushima
Films with screenplays by Shinobu Hashimoto
Toho films
1950s historical drama films
1957 drama films
1950s Japanese films